Roucourt is a commune in the Nord department in northern France. German Jagdstaffel 11 operated here on 13 April, 1917.

Heraldry

See also
Communes of the Nord department

References

Communes of Nord (French department)
French Flanders